4-Vinyltoluene is an organic compound with the formula CH3C6H4CH=CH2.  It is derivative of styrene and is used as a comonomer in the production of specialized polystyrenes.  It is produced by the dehydrogenation of 4-ethyltoluene. It is also sometimes used in the production of styrene-free Polyester resin.

References

Monomers
Vinylbenzenes
C3-Benzenes